The Mehi River is a perennial watercourse that is part of the Barwon catchment within the Murray–Darling basin, located in the Orana district of New South Wales, Australia.

The river rises from the Gwydir River west of Pallamallawa, and flows generally west and west-southwest, joined by eight minor tributaries, before reaching its confluence with the Barwon River near Collarenebri. It descends  over its  course.

History

The river which branches off at the Tareelaroi Weir was previously known as the Gwydir River or Meei River. The Geographical Names Board of New South Wales officially named Mehi as the  tributary of the Gwydir River in 1975 ending years of confusion over the naming of this section.

In 1889 a timber bridge was erected over the Mehi River at Moree. Another bridge was built over Mehi River, Moree in April 1960. A bridge over the Mehi River, west of Moree, was completed in December 1995. A total of four bridges cross the Mehi River in Moree; two of these bridges are low-level and subject to flooding.

The area adjoining the river has numerous attractive riverside parks, golf links and reserves. The Mehi River jetty at Moree is a popular spot for water sports.

During 2008 plans were drawn up to install a fish passage at Moree which will open up a  "freeway" for native fish between Copeton Dam and Collarenebri. The Barwon River-Gwydir Catchment Management Authority has provided $175,000 to Moree Plains Shire Council to install a fish passage at the Moree Town Weir. The Mehi River and the Carole and Gil Gil creeks have been channelised to assist with delivery of water to the irrigation industry.

Native fish that are found in the Gwydir-Mehi river system include bony bream, Murray cod, spangled perch, golden perch, which are often known as yellowbelly and eel-tailed catfish.

Flooding
Moree has been flooded regularly over the years by the Mehi River. The Gwydir Highway, too is subject to flooding of the Gwydir and Mehi Rivers (the highway is actually on an island in the middle of these two rivers near Collarenebri). Moree can also become isolated by road and rail when floods are high enough. Such was the case in the February 1971 floods when Moree was isolated for two weeks. Vast agricultural areas in the Mehi River floodplain become flooded in large floods. Some areas remained underwater for days, and in some cases, as long as a couple of weeks costing farmers thousands of dollars in ruined crops.

See also

 Rivers of New South Wales
 List of rivers of Australia

References

External links
 

Rivers of New South Wales
Murray-Darling basin
Newell Highway